The Alameda Works Shipyard, in Alameda, California, United States, was one of the largest and best equipped shipyards in the country. The only building remaining from the yard is the Union Iron Works Powerhouse, which is listed on the National Register of Historic Places.1956.

History
Established in the early 1900s by United Engineering Works, the yard was purchased by Union Iron Works (Bethlehem Shipbuilding Corporation) in 1916 and came to be known as the Alameda Works.

During the World War I period the yard built cargo ships, tankers and 2 small tugboats.

For the UK Admiralty
 War Knight, War Monarch, War Sword (1917, 7,700t cargo)
 War Harbor, War Haven, War Ocean, War Rock, War Sea (1918, 7,600t cargo)
 War Cape / Pan Massachusetts, War Surf, War Wave (1919, 7,600t cargo)
For other private contractors
 Talabot, Bessa (1917, 7,700t cargo)
For Atlantic Refining
 J. E. O'Neill, Herbert L. Pratt, W. M. Irish, W. M. Burton (1918, 7,100t tanker)
For Standard Oil of New Jersey
 W. S. Rheem (1918, 6,800t tanker)
 Franklin K. Lane, Crampton Anderson (1920 and 1921, 6,600t tanker)
For Standard Oil of California
 W. S. Miller (1920, 7,000t tanker)
 K. R. Kingsbury (1921, 8,800t tanker)
 F. H. Hillman, H. M. Storey, W. S. Rheem (1921-1922, 10,800t tanker)
For Socony-Vacuum Oil
 Algonquin, Yorba Linda (1919 and 1920, 7,000t tanker)
For Bethlehem's own Ore Steamship Company
 Chilore, Lebore (1923 and 1924, 8,300t ore carriers)
For the United States Shipping Board
 Volunteer (1220), Challenger (1222), Steadfast (1223) (1918, 7,700t cargo)
 2 of 5 Design 1032 ships
 Heffron (1574), Hegira (1575) (1919, 7,600t cargo)
 17 tankers of 7,000t in 1919 and 1920
 Richconcal (1460) ... Cathwood (1469)
 Dungannon (1471) ... Halway (1475)
 Hambro (1679), Hamer (1680)

tugs Dreadnaught, UndauntedChallenger, Independence (War Harbor), Victorious (War Haven) and Defiance (War Ocean) were all launched on 4 July 1918.

The Lebore'' was the last ship delivered (January 1924) during that production period.

After 1923, the Alameda Works ceased making ships but continued its dry docking and ship repair operations.

At the beginning of World War II, the Alameda Works was re-established as the Bethlehem Alameda Shipyard, and modernized and expanded to include new shipways and on-site worker housing. During the war produced P-2 Admiral-type troop ships, as well as some repair work and it continued to produce structural steel.

Union Iron Works Powerhouse
This power station was designed by San Francisco architect Frederick Meyer, one of many designed for the Pacific Gas and Electric Company in Northern California between 1905 and the 1920s. Designed in a simplified Renaissance Revival style, the powerhouse is an excellent example of a building type-the "beautiful" power house-for which the San Francisco Bay Area was nationally known. It contained several large generators and was constructed specifically to meet the massive electricity requirements of the yards.1956.

Today, the little building that once powered an entire shipyard has been converted into private office space and is closed to the public.

See also
 Moore Dry Dock Company#Shipbuilding in Oakland and Alameda
 Naval Air Station Alameda — nearby airfield
 Union Iron Works — the other San Francisco Bethlehem yard across the bay
 Federal Shipbuilding and Drydock Company of New Jersey, built the remaining P2 transports
 Two-Ocean Navy Act — Alameda Works cargo ships were apparently preferred to be acquired for conversion to Attack transports in the early stages of the industrial mobilization.

Footnotes

References

External links

History of Alameda County, California
Bethlehem shipyards
Defunct shipbuilding companies of the United States
Historic American Engineering Record in California
Industrial buildings and structures on the National Register of Historic Places in California
National Register of Historic Places in Alameda County, California
Shipyards in California
Manufacturing plants in the United States
World War II on the National Register of Historic Places in California
Buildings and structures in Alameda, California
Shipyards on the National Register of Historic Places
Transportation buildings and structures in Alameda County, California
1900s establishments in California
Vigor Shipyards